Ambalona is a river in eastern Madagascar. It flows into the Indian Ocean south of Toamasina.

See also

List of rivers of Madagascar

References 

Rivers of Atsinanana